Belize is divided into six districts.


List

See also
Constituencies of Belize
List of municipalities in Belize
List of West Indian First-level Subdivisions
ISO 3166-2:BZ
Commonwealth Local Government Forum-Americas

References

External links
Detailed Map of Belize showing Districts and their major towns.

 
Subdivisions of Belize
Belize, Districts
Belize 1
Districts, Belize
Belize geography-related lists